The 2022 season was the New England Patriots' 53rd in the National Football League (NFL), their 63rd overall, their 21st playing home games at Gillette Stadium and their 23rd under head coach Bill Belichick.

Since the end of the 2021 season, there were a number of key roster changes among starters for the team. Running back James White announced his retirement, while linebacker Kyle Van Noy was cut, and defensive end Chase Winovich, wide receiver N'Keal Harry, and guard Shaq Mason, all 2021 starters, were traded to other teams. New arrivals including running back/wide receiver Ty Montgomery from New Orleans, wide receiver DeVante Parker from Miami, and linebacker Mack Wilson from Cleveland. Malcolm Butler, the hero of Super Bowl XLIX, returned to the team after a four-year absence, but an injury in preseason led to his being released. Offensive coordinator Josh McDaniels left to take the head coaching job for the Las Vegas Raiders, taking a number of Patriots assistant coaches with him. The team also wore their red and white throwback uniforms as an alternate uniform for the first time in ten years. 

An early-season injury to starting quarterback Mac Jones led to a quarterback controversy as his replacement, Bailey Zappe, led the team to two straight wins in weeks 4–6, but was relegated to a backup role following Jones' return.  By Week 10, the team was sitting at 6–4, but lost five of their next seven games including their final game of the season to the Buffalo Bills, ending the season with a 8–9 record.  They failed to make the playoffs for the second time in three years.  Linebacker Matthew Judon was the team's lone selection to the 2023 Pro Bowl Games.  Among the memorable moments of the season was a Week 15 loss to the Las Vegas Raiders, which involved a desperation lateral play that went awry and resulted in a last-second Raiders touchdown.

Roster changes

Free agency

Unrestricted

Restricted

Exclusive-rights

Signings/waiver claims

Releases/waivers

Retirements

Trades

March 17 – Defensive end Chase Winovich was traded to the 2022 Cleveland Browns season|Cleveland Browns in exchange for  Mack Wilson.
March 17 – Guard (gridiron football)|Guard Shaq Mason was traded to the 2022 Tampa Bay Buccaneers season|Tampa Bay Buccaneers in exchange for a 2022 NFL Draft|2022 fifth-round selection (No. 170).
April 5 – The Patriots' 2023 NFL Draft|2023 third-round selection was traded to the 2022 Miami Dolphins season|Miami Dolphins in exchange for wide receiver DeVante Parker and a 2022 NFL Draft|2022 fifth-round selection.
May 13 –  Jarrett Stidham and a 2023 NFL Draft|2023 seventh-round selection were traded to the 2022 Las Vegas Raiders season|Las Vegas Raiders in exchange for a 2023 sixth-round selection.
July 13 – Wide receiver N'Keal Harry was traded to the 2022 Chicago Bears season|Chicago Bears in exchange for a 2024 NFL Draft|2024 seventh-round selection.
September 21 – Tackle (gridiron football position)|Offensive tackle Justin Herron and a 2024 NFL Draft|2024 seventh-round selection were traded to the 2022 Las Vegas Raiders season|Las Vegas Raiders in exchange for a 2024 sixth-round selection.

Draft

Draft trades

Uniform changes
For the first time since the 2012 season, the Patriots will wear their red and white "throwback" uniforms for select games.  The red jersey and white helmet combination, with the  "Pat the Patriot" logo, was last worn regularly in the 1992 New England Patriots season.  The Patriots wore it for select games as an alternate uniform starting 2002, but NFL rules restricting teams to wearing the same helmet designs for the entire season were enacted after 2012.  When that rule was rescinded for the 2022 season, the Patriots brought back their classic uniforms as an alternate. In week 7 against the Chicago Bears, the Patriots wore silver pants for the first time since the 2019 season, but the red stripes were more wider than the previous silver pants to match the blue pants style.

Staff

Coaching changes

Final roster

Preseason
The Patriots' preseason and regular season opponents and schedule were announced on May 12th.

Regular season

Schedule

Note: Intra-division opponents are in bold text.

Game summaries

Week 1: at Miami Dolphins

The game featured a slow start, with the first score coming via a Jason Sanders field goal for the Dolphins with 4:06 remaining in the first quarter, and the first touchdown coming on a  Melvin Ingram fumble recovery, also for the Dolphins, coming at 7:40 left in the second quarter.  The sole offensive touchdown went to the Patriots on a 6-yard reception by Ty Montgomery from Mac Jones, though the Patriots would lose the game 20–7, marking the second year in a row that the Patriots lost to the Dolphins on Opening Day, and the fourth straight loss to them in this rivalry.  A late-game back injury to Mac Jones led to some post-game X-rays, but he was cleared to play in Week 2.

Week 2: at Pittsburgh Steelers

The Patriots held the Steelers to a three-and-out on the opening drive, and themselves had a 13-play long ball-control focused first drive that resulted in a 28-yard Nick Folk field goal and ate up 6:45 of game clock.  The teams traded interceptions on the final two drives of the first period, with the Steelers getting their own field goal off the foot of Chris Boswell to tie the game up at 3–3 with 8:35 left to play in the second quarter.  With time running out in the half, Nelson Agholor made a difficult catch while closely covered by the Miami defender to give the Patriots a 10–3 lead going in to half-time.  The Patriots would not relinquish the lead; the Steelers bringing it to 17–14 following a Pat Freiermuth reception on the first play of the fourth quarter and a Diontae Johnson reception for the ensuing two-point conversion.  The teams then traded punts for the remainder of the game, with the Patriots ending as they started, with another 13-play drive that used up the final 6:33 of game time, to preserve the win.  For the 21st year in a row, the Patriots began the year with at least a 1–1 record.

Week 3: vs. Baltimore Ravens

In the Patriots home opener against the Ravens, Baltimore scored first on a five-yard reception by Mark Andrews.  The Patriots answered with a Nick Folk field goal and, on the next drive, a three-yard quarterback keeper by Mac Jones to bring the Patriots to 10–7.  Lamar Jackson hit Mark Andrews for a second touchdown to take the lead back, while Nick Folk hit a 50-yard field field goal to bring the Patriots to within one point as time expired at half time.  A two-yard Damien Harris run on the opening drive of the second half gave the patriots a 20–14 lead.  Baltimore took the lead 21–20 on the next possession, capping their 7-play, 74-yard drive with a 1 yard Jackson to Josh Oliver pass for a touchdown.  Baltimore would not relinquish the lead, despite a fourth quarter Rhamondre Stevenson run and missed two-point conversion that brought the Patriots to within five, the Ravens scored on a 9-yard Lamar Jackson run that gave the Ravens their final 37–26 win.  Mac Jones suffered a left leg injury at the two-minute warning of the final quarter after throwing his third interception. This was the Pats' first regular season home loss to the Ravens in franchise history, and their first home loss to them since the 2012 AFC Championship Game.

Week 4: at Green Bay Packers

Following the injury to Mac Jones the prior week, journeyman backup Brian Hoyer was given the start, but he was taken out of the game on the Patriots second offensive series due to a head injury.  At that point, the Patriots were up 3–0 on a Nick Folk field goal.  Rookie third-string quarterback Bailey Zappe played the rest of the game.  Green Bay took their first lead on a Christian Watson 15-yard run, while the Patriots' Jack Jones returned an interception of an Aaron Rodgers pass 40 yards to give the Patriots a 10–7 lead at halftime.  The teams traded scores throughout the second half, with the game going into overtime tied 24–24.  The Packers won the overtime coin toss for first possession, then each team was forced into a 3-and-out situation to start the overtime.  The Packers then ran a clock-dominating 11-play drive to 13-yard line, and Mason Crosby kicked the game-winning field goal as the clock expired at the end of overtime.  Zappe, in his first game action of the season, played efficiently and didn't make any major mistakes, ending the game 10-for-15 with 1 touchdown and no interceptions on 99 yards passing.

Week 5: vs. Detroit Lions

For the first time in ten years, the Patriots played in their red throwback uniforms, with the popular Pat the Patriot logo occupying the center of the field. Bailey Zappe, who started the season third on the quarterback depth chart, was given his first start as both Mac Jones (leg) and Brian Hoyer (head) were injured.  The Patriots dominated all phases of the game, earning a shutout win 29–0, as running back Rhamondre Stephenson carried the bulk of the Patriots offensive output, accounting for 161 rushing yards on 25 carries, and adding 2 receptions for 14 yards.  Zappe again played efficiently, going 17-for-21 with 1 touchdown on 188 yards passing; the lone blemish on his record being an interception that wide receiver Nelson Agholor had in his hands, but lost to free safety DeShon Elliott.  On the defensive side of the ball, fan favorite Matthew Judon had two sacks and a forced fumble in the shutout win.

Week 6: at Cleveland Browns

Rookie quarterback Bailey Zappe started his second game in a row under center, and for the first time in his three appearances this season looked like more than a game manager, throwing the ball very well, going 24-for-34 with 2 touchdowns on 309 yards, for a 118.4 passer rating.  Rhamondre Stevenson added two touchdowns on the ground and continued to carry the bulk of the Patriots running game, going for 76 yards on 19 carries.  Rookie wide receiver Tyquan Thornton played in his much-anticipated first game of the season, and produced immediately, scoring on both a receiving and rushing touchdown.  Once again the defense dominated the opponent, with the Browns never leading for the entire game, which the Patriots won 38–15 in which the Browns only touchdown came too late in the game to matter.  Matthew Judon ended his 5-game sack streak to start the season, but did contribute four tackles, one for loss, while both Kyle Dugger and Jalen Mills had interceptions.

Week 7: vs. Chicago Bears

This was the first time in 22 years the Pats lost to the Bears, and their first-ever home loss to them in franchise history. The Bears rushed for 243 yards in the victory.

Week 8: at New York Jets

This win not only marks their 13th straight against the Jets in this rivalry, but also was Bill Belichick's 325th career win, surpassing George Halas for second place in total career wins by a head coach, including the playoffs.

Week 9: vs. Indianapolis Colts

With the win (their second straight this season), the Pats won their seventh straight home meeting against the Colts, and are now above .500 for the first time this season.

Week 11: vs. New York Jets

This win, thanks to a punt return TD with five seconds left in the game, marks the third straight for this season and the 14th straight against the Jets in this rivalry.

Week 12: at Minnesota Vikings
Thanksgiving Day games

Despite Mac Jones passing for a career-high 382 yards and two touchdowns, the Patriots were unable to beat Kirk Cousins and the Vikings, losing a Thanksgiving night shootout 33–26. This was the Pats' first loss to the Vikings in 22 years.

Week 13: vs. Buffalo Bills

Despite forcing Buffalo to punt for the first time in 23 drives in games played between the two division rivals and scoring on their opening drive, the Patriots struggled on offense throughout the game as they lost to the Bills 24–10. This was the third season in a row the Pats lost to the Bills at home in this rivalry.

Week 14: at Arizona Cardinals

The Pats won due to a strong performance by the rushing attack and defense, in addition to Cardinals quarterback Kyler Murray suffering a torn ACL on the third play of the game. Unfortunately, several of New England's starters were also injured during the game, including running back Rhamondre Stevenson, receiver DeVante Parker, and cornerback Jack Jones.

Week 15: at Las Vegas Raiders

Despite a strong performance from Rhamondre Stevenson, who returned from injury, and overcoming an early 17–3 deficit, the Patriots allowed the Raiders to tie the game at 24 with a controversial touchdown pass from Derek Carr to Keelan Cole, then lost off a walk-off touchdown by Raiders defensive end and former Patriot Chandler Jones, who intercepted an attempted lateral pass from receiver Jakobi Meyers as time ran out. Notably, the failed lateral play by Stevenson and Meyers at the end of the game, which has gained the monikers the "Lunatic Lateral" and "Col-lateral damage" from the media, happened just over four years after the Miracle in Miami, which was a successful lateral pass play by the Miami Dolphins to defeat the Patriots.

With the Pats' first loss to the Raiders in 20 years, they fell to 7–7 and just outside the playoff picture.

Week 16: vs. Cincinnati Bengals

This was the Pats' first loss to the Bengals in nine years, and their first home loss to them in 36 years.  Because of this, they drop below .500 for the first time since week 7.

Week 17: vs. Miami Dolphins

With the win, the Pats return to .500 and are still alive in the playoff hunt.

Week 18: at Buffalo Bills

With the loss, the Pats got swept by the Bills for the second time in three years and are out of the playoffs for the second time in three years.  This is also the second time in three years the Pats finish with a losing record.

Standings

Division

Conference

References

External links

New England
New England Patriots seasons
New England Patriots